The Ctenocerinae are a subfamily of spider wasps, Pompilidae, which contains a small number of genera, two in the Neotropics, four in Australia and the remainder in Africa.  Ctenocerine wasps have evidently evolved from a common ancestor with the Pepsinae,  but are specialized for preying upon trap-door spiders (Ctenizidae).

Genera
The genera in the Ctenocerinae include:

Abernessia Arlé, 1947
Apoclavelia Evans, 1972
Apteropompilus Brauns, 1899
Apteropompiloides Brauns, 1899
Arnoldatus Pate, 1946
Ateloclavelia Arnold, 1932
Austroclavelia Evans, 1972
Clavelia Lucas, 1851
Claveliella Arnold, 1939
Cteniziphontes Evans, 1972
Ctenocerus Dahlbom, 1845
Hadropompilus Arnold, 1934
Hypoferreola Ashmead, 1902
Lepidocnemis Haupt, 1930
Marimba Pate, 1946
Masisia Arnold, 1934
Maurillus Smith, 1855
Micragenia Arnold, 1934
Paraclavelia Haupt, 1930
Parapompilus Smith, 1855
Parapsilotelus Arnold, 1960
Pezopompilus Arnold, 1946
Protoclavelia Arnold, 1932
Pseudopedinaspis Brauns, 1906
Psilotelus Arnold, 1932
Spathomelus Wahis, 2013
Stenoclavelia Arnold, 1935
Teinotrachelus Arnold, 1935
Trichosalius Arnold, 1934

References

Apocrita subfamilies
Pompilidae